Jordan Boy (born 20 March 1994) is a French footballer who currently plays for Championnat de France Amateur 2 side Louhans-Cuiseaux. He plays as a midfielder.

Club career 

Boy is a youth exponent from Evian Thonon Gaillard. He made his Ligue 1 debut on 23 May 2015 against SM Caen. He replaced Jesper Juelsgård after 57 minutes.

References

External links

French footballers
Ligue 1 players
1994 births
Living people
Association football midfielders
Thonon Evian Grand Genève F.C. players